Shiva Ka Insaaf (English: Shiva's Justice) is a 1985 Indian Hindi-language superhero film directed by Raj N. Sippy. The film stars Jackie Shroff, Poonam Dhillon, Shakti Kapoor, Gulshan Grover. The music was composed by R. D. Burman. The film is termed as the first Hindi film to be filmed in 3D.

Plot 
Bhola, whose parents get killed by Jagan (Shakti Kapoor). He is then raised by 3 strong men named Ram (Vinod Mehra), Rahim (Mazhar Khan), Robert (Parikshit Sahni). They groomed Bhola with various physical training and he becomes a powerful Shiva (Jackie Shroff). He leaves his village and goes to a city to work as a journalist, where he meets Nisha (Poonam Dhillon). There he lives the life of Bhola. When she finds his reality, they fall in love with each other. At the end, he kills Jagan, who killed his parents as well as his son Vikram (Gulshan Grover).

Cast
Jackie Shroff as Bhola / Shiva
Poonam Dhillon as Nisha
Shakti Kapoor as Jagan
Gulshan Grover as Vikram
Vinod Mehra as Ram
Mazhar Khan as Rahim
Parikshit Sahni as Robert
Satish Kaul as Advocate Prakashnath

Soundtrack
Lyrics: Gulshan Bawra

References

External links 
 

1985 films
1980s Hindi-language films
Indian action films
1980s Indian superhero films
Indian films about revenge
Indian vigilante films
Indian children's films
Indian 3D films
Films scored by R. D. Burman
Films set in Mumbai
Films directed by Raj N. Sippy
1985 3D films
1985 action films
1980s children's films
Indian science fiction films
Indian superhero films